Marti is a village in Tuscany, central Italy, administratively a frazione of the comune of Montopoli in Val d'Arno, province of Pisa. At the time of the 2001 census its population was 1,046.

Marti is about 38 km from Pisa and 4 km from Montopoli in Val d'Arno.

Main sights 
 Santa Maria Novella

References 

Frazioni of the Province of Pisa